Delio César Toledo Rodas (born 2 October 1976) is a Paraguayan retired footballer who played as a left back.

During his professional career, he represented clubs in five countries, competing mainly in La Liga. Toledo appeared with the Paraguay national team at the 1999 Copa América and the 2006 World Cup.

Club career
Born in Doctor Cecilio Báez, Caaguazú Department, Toledo started his career in Club Atlético Colegiales from where, after a good season, he was transferred to Cerro Porteño. He then moved to Europe where he played briefly for Udinese Calcio (January–December 1999) and RCD Espanyol (January 2000 – June 2001); with the latter club he was involved in a forged passport scandal which led to a ban, in his first full season.

After a brief spell back in South America with Colón de Santa Fe, Toledo returned to Spain, now with Real Zaragoza in the second division. He scored once in 31 games en route to promotion, being used regularly in the subsequent three seasons.

Toledo signed with Kayserispor of Turkey in July 2006, winning the domestic cup in his second year. He decided to retire from football due to injury in early 2010, but returned to football – and Kayserispor – on 29 March, in a match against Trabzonspor.

International career
Internationally, Toledo represented Paraguay on 35 occasions, playing 82 minutes against England in a group stage 0–1 loss at the 2006 FIFA World Cup. He was also selected for the squad at the 1999 Copa América played on home soil, as the national team reached the quarterfinals.

Toledo earned his first cap on 7 March 1999 in the Copa de la Paz, netting the second goal in a 3–0 win over Bolivia.

Honours

Club
Espanyol
Copa del Rey: 1999–2000

Zaragoza
Copa del Rey: 2003–04
Supercopa de España: 2004

Kayserispor
Turkish Cup: 2007–08
Turkish Super Cup: Runner-up 2008

References

External links

1976 births
Living people
Paraguayan people of Spanish descent
Paraguayan footballers
Association football defenders
Paraguayan Primera División players
Cerro Porteño players
Serie A players
Udinese Calcio players
La Liga players
Segunda División players
RCD Espanyol footballers
Real Zaragoza players
Argentine Primera División players
Club Atlético Colón footballers
Süper Lig players
Kayserispor footballers
Paraguay international footballers
1999 Copa América players
2006 FIFA World Cup players
Paraguayan expatriate footballers
Expatriate footballers in Italy
Expatriate footballers in Spain
Expatriate footballers in Argentina
Expatriate footballers in Turkey
Paraguayan expatriate sportspeople in Italy
Paraguayan expatriate sportspeople in Spain
Paraguayan expatriate sportspeople in Argentina
Paraguayan expatriate sportspeople in Turkey